David Michael Hill (born 6 June 1966 in Nottingham) is an English former professional footballer and is the former manager of Cobh Ramblers.

He made 327 league appearances in England with Scunthorpe United, Ipswich Town, Lincoln City and Chesterfield before moving to Ireland in 1995 and joining Cork City. He spent 5 seasons at the club, winning an FAI Cup winners medal and League of Ireland Cup winners medal. He also picked up 2 runners up medals in the League of Ireland Premier Division.

In August 2000, Hill moved to Dublin to Bohemians. In his first season, he finally won a Premier Division winners medal and to top it off, he was part of the team that completed the "Double" a week later when winning the FAI Cup. Hill spent another season at Bohs before taking up the offer of the player/manager job at First Division side Cobh Ramblers. He spent 2 seasons here and reached the playoffs but couldn't get the club promoted. He then became assistant manager at Cork City. He left when Damien Richardson was sacked.

Honours
 League of Ireland: 1
 Bohemians - 2000–01
 FAI Cup: 2
 Cork City - 1998
 Bohemians - 2001
 League of Ireland Cup: 1
 Cork City - 1998-99

References

External links

1966 births
Living people
Footballers from Nottingham
English footballers
League of Ireland players
Lincoln City F.C. players
Chesterfield F.C. players
Scunthorpe United F.C. players
Ipswich Town F.C. players
Bohemian F.C. players
Cork City F.C. players
Cobh Ramblers F.C. players
League of Ireland managers
Association football midfielders
English football managers